José María Reina Andrade (1 November 1860 – 25 April 1947) was the acting President of Guatemala from 2 January 1931 to 14 February 1931.

Reina Andrade was appointed by the Congress of Guatemala on 31 December 1930, as president of the Republic. On 2 January 1931, he called for Congress to take over the chairmanship of the republic. He remained in power just long enough while making the call for elections to the members of the Liberal Party to achieve taxation power for Jorge Ubico. It is said he received specific instructions from Jorge Ubico and the Liberal Party to convene elections quickly.

Andrade left power as a result of the elections that handed the presidency to Ubico on 14 February  1931.

Manuel Estrada Cabrera government 

Reina Andrade served as Secretary of the Interior during the second presidential term of Manuel Estrada Cabrera—from 1905 to 1911—and he was in charge of the investigations of the murder attempts against the president that took place on April 29, 1907 -"The bomb"- and on April 20, 1908 -"Cadets assassination attempt"-.

"The bomb" 

In early 1907, lawyer Enrique Ávila Echeverría and his brother, physician Jorge Ávila Echeverría, along with Dr. Julio Valdés Blanco and electrical engineer Baltasar Rodil, planned a bombing attack on the president of Guatemala, Manuel Estrada Cabrera, which took place on 29 April 1907, and is generally known in Guatemala as "The Bomb". The Echeverría brothers and their mates were from the elite class and had studied abroad, but when they came back to Guatemala, they did not like what they saw: a country where there was extreme abuse of power. When they decided to try to kill the president, they chose to use explosives. They prepared everything meticulously: the explosives, the detonators, the day and the exact time; even the president's driver -Patrocinio Monterroso- was on board.

On the day planned for the attack, 29 April, the president was traveling in his chariot along his 13-year-old son, Joaquin, and his chief of staff, general José María Orellana. Around 10 a.m., they were on the 7th. S. Avenue, in between the 16th and 17th W streets when the bomb went off. However, by a miscalculation, Estrada Cabrera and those that were with him were unharmed. Only his driver and one of the horses died.

On 2 May 1907, Emilio Ubico, brother of Arturo Ubico Urruela -president of Congress- and uncle of Jorge Ubico Castañeda -political chief of Verapaz-, was appointed as Chief of Police, in charge of the investigations, along the Secretary of the Interior, Reina Andrade. A few days later, Congress issued Decree 737, by which any explosive related import was prohibited, unless previously authorized by the Secretary of War.

Over the next twenty two days, the four conspirators fled through the small streets and little holes that they could find, trying to escape from Guatemala City, but they could not escape because the government surround the city and slowly started to close in while combing every inch of terrain. Even their families were prosecuted and incarcerated. They were others conspirators, brothers Juan and Adolfo Viteri and Francisco Valladares, were arrested when they were trying to flee disguised as women in Guastatoya. Others, like Felipe and Rafael Prado Romaña, tried to flee to El Salvador, but were captured when somebody told on them- the Romaña brothers were in prison until their death-. Only the Colombian Rafael Madriñán escaped on a bike and left the country. The mother of the Romaña brothers took the Mexican Ambassador, Federico Camboa, to the house where the Avila Echeverría brothers and his friends were hiding, who, knowing that they had only days to live, gave him all their valuables and beg him to pass them on to their relatives.

At last, after several days of uncertainty, Rufina Roca de Monzón gave them shelter in the second floor of her home, # 29 Judío Place in Guatemala City, but a spy learned about it.  on May 20, 1907, at 3 a.m. the house was surrounded by a soldier platoon. The troop brought down the door and tried to reach the second floor, but at that moment crossed gunfire started; by 6 a.m. the conspirators were out of ammo and exhausted and decided to kill themselves before becoming prisoners of the regime. The Diario de Centro América, then a semi-official newspaper owned by Estrada Cabrera, went as far as to publish the conspirators autopsy details.

"The cadets" assassination attempt 

By 1908, Santo Domingo Church members had modified the path of its centennial and traditional Good Friday procession, such that now is passed in front of Estrada Cabrera house on the 7th S. Avenue in Guatemala City.  That year, several Military Academy cadets, after noticing that the procession uniforms completely covered the face of the penitents, decided to disguise themselves and blend in the procession and by the time it passed in front of the president's house, they would storm in and take him prisoner. However, the extremely efficient spy system that Estrada Cabrera had in place allowed him to thwart the kidnapping attempt.  As soon as he learned about this, Estrada Cabrera prohibited the procession from pass in front of his house, placed a fenced on front of it and prohibited the use of masks for the Holy Week processions.

On 20 April 1908, during the official reception of the new United States Ambassador in the National Palace, Military Academy cadet Víctor Manuel Vega, in revenge of what happened to his classmates and teachers, shot Estrada Cabrera point black, but only managed to hurt him on his pinky finger.  A flag from the official escort avoided the bullet from reaching the president. Enraged, and in order to set a precedent, Estrada Cabrera order to shoot all Vega's Military Academy unit, except two, Rogelio Girón and Manuel Hurtarte, who were taken prisoners without any legal document.  Vega had died on the spot where he tried to attack the president, killed instantly by his bodyguards. The president also ordered the Military Academy to be closed, its building demolished and that salt would be spread on the field. Several military officers were sent to prison, including some loyal to the president.

Notes

References

Bibliography 

 
 
 
 
 
 
 
 
 
 
 
 
 
 
 
 
 
 

Presidents of Guatemala
Vice presidents of Guatemala
1860 births
1947 deaths
Liberal Party (Guatemala) politicians
20th-century Guatemalan people